Huh Gak (born November 15, 1984) is a South Korean singer. He rose to fame after winning the 2010 Mnet talent competition series Superstar K 2, during which he became known as "the Korean Paul Potts."

Early life and education
Huh Gak was born in Incheon, South Korea on November 15, 1984. His parents divorced when he was three years old, and he and his twin brother, Huh Gong, were raised by their father. Due to this family's financial difficulties, Huh dropped out of school after finishing middle school and worked as a repairman and event singer. Huh later earned his high school diploma in 2018.

Career

2010–present: Superstar K 2, debut, and First Story
In 2010, Huh Gak competed on the Mnet talent competition series Superstar K 2 and took the first place spot in the show's finale in October. Following the show, Huh released his debut single "Always," which topped the Gaon Digital Chart. On 16 November, he released his self-titled, first mini album.

After joining A Cube Entertainment in early 2011, Huh released the mini album First Story on 16 September. The album spawned the hit single "Hello," which took the #1 spot on the Gaon Digital Chart (also earning a "triple crown" for topping the component Download, Streaming, and BGM charts) and Billboard's K-pop Hot 100 chart.

On October 8, 2021, Huh Gak left Play M Entertainment after his contract expired. On October 27, 2021, Huh Gak signed with BPM Entertainment.

Personal life 
On October 3, 2013, Huh Gak married his "first love," whom he dated in middle school when they were 16 years old. They met again after 13 years in February 2012. Huh and his wife have two sons: Huh Geon (born 2014) and Huh Gang (born 2015).

Discography

Studio albums

Extended plays

Singles

Collaborations

Soundtrack appearances

Other charted songs

Concerts
As well as numerous appearances on Superstar K2, on 18 January 2011, he participated in a Traditional Korean music concert called "Noon concert".

Filmography

Television show

SuperStar K2

Awards and nominations

References

1984 births
Identical twins
Living people
Musicians from Incheon
BPM Entertainment artists
South Korean pop singers
South Korean rhythm and blues singers
Superstar K winners
South Korean twins
MAMA Award winners
Melon Music Award winners
Heo clan of Yangcheon
21st-century South Korean male singers